In enzymology, a D-arabinono-1,4-lactone oxidase is an enzyme that catalyzes the chemical reaction

D-arabinono-1,4-lactone + O2  D-erythro-ascorbate + H2O2

Thus, the two substrates of this enzyme are D-arabinono-1,4-lactone and O2, whereas its two products are D-erythro-ascorbate and H2O2.

This enzyme belongs to the family of oxidoreductases, specifically those acting on the CH-OH group of donor with oxygen as acceptor.  The systematic name of this enzyme class is D-arabinono-1,4-lactone:oxygen oxidoreductase. It employs one cofactor, FAD.

References

 

EC 1.1.3
Flavoproteins
Enzymes of unknown structure